Make America Crip Again is the second extended play by American rapper Snoop Dogg. The EP was released on October 27, 2017, by Doggystyle Records and Empire Distribution. It features guest appearances from Chris Brown, O.T. Genasis and October London, among others, with production from Kid Capri and Dâm-Funk, among others. It was preceded by two singles, "Dis Finna Be a Breeze!" and "M.A.C.A.".

Background
In an interview with Rolling Stone, Snoop Dogg explained the EP's title, by stating

Artwork
The cover of the original MP3 release features a blue baseball cap with the words "Make America Crip Again", a reference to "Make America Great Again" hats worn by Donald Trump supporters.

The album cover, released October 31, 2017, features Snoop Dogg standing behind a corpse with an identification tag reading "Trump". The cover is an homage to Ice Cube's 1991 album Death Certificate.

Singles
The lead single, "Dis Finna Be a Breeze!" featuring comedian Ha Ha Davis was released on September 29, 2017.

The second single, "M.A.C.A." was released on October 23, 2017.

Track listing

Notes
  signifies a co-producer

Sample credits
 "M.A.C.A." contains a sample of "La Di Da Di", as performed by Doug E. Fresh and MC Ricky D and interpolations of "Hey Young World", as performed by Slick Rick.

References

Snoop Dogg albums
2017 EPs
Crips
EPs by American artists
Empire Distribution EPs